Brian Eugene Howard (born October 19, 1967) is an American former professional basketball player.  A 6'6" and 204 lb small forward from North Carolina State University, Howard played briefly for the NBA's Dallas Mavericks from 1992 to 1993. In 95 games for the Mavs, he averaged 6.0 points and 2.8 rebound a game. He has also played in Turkey for Efes Pilsen and in France for ASVEL Lyon-Villeurbanne.

Notes

External links
Brian Howard NBA stats @ basketballreference.com
European competitions stats @ Fibaeurope.com
Player profile @ ACB.com

1967 births
Living people
African-American basketball players
American expatriate basketball people in the Czech Republic
American expatriate basketball people in France
American expatriate basketball people in Italy
American expatriate basketball people in Spain
American expatriate basketball people in Turkey
American men's basketball players
Anadolu Efes S.K. players
ASVEL Basket players
Auxilium Pallacanestro Torino players
Basketball players from Winston-Salem, North Carolina
BC Nový Jičín players
Bilbao Basket players
Dallas Mavericks players
Élan Chalon players
Liga ACB players
NC State Wolfpack men's basketball players
Olympique Antibes basketball players
Omaha Racers players
Paris Racing Basket players
SIG Basket players
Sioux Falls Skyforce (CBA) players
Small forwards
Undrafted National Basketball Association players